The Thistle Curling Club is the name of a number of curling clubs:

Current clubs
Delta Thistle Curling Club in Delta, British Columbia
Thistle Curling Club (Edmonton) in Edmonton
Thistle Curling Club (Winnipeg) in Winnipeg

Former clubs
Thistle Curling Club (Hamilton) in Hamilton, Ontario (closed in 2002)
Thistle Curling Club (Montreal) in Montreal (closed in 1999)
Thistle Curling Club (Saint John) in Saint John, New Brunswick. Merged with the St. Andrew's Curling Club in 1975 becoming the Thistle-St. Andrew's Curling Club.

References